Macroteleia is a genus of parasitoid wasps in the family Platygastridae. There are more than 140 described species in Macroteleia.

See also
 List of Macroteleia species

References

Further reading

External links

 

Parasitic wasps
Articles created by Qbugbot
Scelioninae